Maquinchao Airport is a public use airport on the northern edge of Maquinchao, a town in the Río Negro Province of  Argentina.

See also

Transport in Argentina
List of airports in Argentina

References

External links 
OpenStreetMap - Maquinchao Airport
OurAirports - Maquinchao Airport

Airports in Argentina
Río Negro Province